RNA, ribosomal 5, also known as RNR5, is a human gene. Genes for ribosomal RNA are clustered on the short arms of chromosomes 13, 14, 15, 20, 21. The gene for RNR5 exists in multiple copies on chromosome 22.  Each gene cluster contains 30–40 copies and encodes a 45S RNA product that is then cleaved to form 18S, 5.8S and 28S rRNA subunits. In general, genes for RNA remain poorly annotated in most large public databases.

References

Further reading

 Nucleolus organizer regions are chromosomal regions crucial for the formation of the nucleolus, located on the short arms of the acrocentric chromosomes 13, 14, 15, 21 and 22

Proteins
Non-coding RNA
RNA
Ribosomal RNA
Ribozymes